Sleeping with the Fishes is a 2013 film starring Gina Rodriguez, Ana Ortiz and Priscilla Lopez.

Plot
Alexis "Lexi" Fish lives in L.A. and works as a mascot and occasional phone sex operator, struggling to get by after the death of her husband. After an estranged aunt dies she returns to New York to attend her funeral and while there butts heads with her overly critical mother, Estella. Her well-meaning older sister, Kayla, meanwhile arranges a last-minute job for Lexi to plan the Bat Mitzvah party for the daughter of one of their acquaintances, Mrs. Wasserstein.

Lexi also encounters the handsome Dominic, (Steven Strait) who runs a club and has a young son. She reveals to him that while her husband and she were high school sweethearts with outwardly successful lives he repeatedly cheated on her during their marriage and left her with debt after his death.

Despite her initial reluctance to plan the Bat Mitzvah party, Lexi is eventually able to throw it together, confronting the overbearing Mrs. Wasserstein in the process and also gaining the courage to reveal her husband's flaws to her mother.

Production
Director Nicole Gomez Fisher was originally reluctant to direct but came on board after being unable to find anyone else to direct her script.

Rodriguez was offered the lead role after Fisher saw her in Filly Brown.

Reception
The film was nominated for 5 Imagen Awards, including Best Picture, Best Director and Best Actress/Supporting Actress nominations for Gina Rodriguez, Ana Ortiz and Priscilla Lopez. Fisher won the award for Best Director.

References

External links
 
 

Films about Jews and Judaism
Films about sisters
2013 romantic comedy films
2013 films